Zalíbená is a village, part of the municipality of Podveky in Kutná Hora District in the Central Bohemian Region of the Czech Republic.

Villages in Kutná Hora District